Gabrou Merawi (born 11 September 1932) is an Ethiopian long-distance runner. He competed in the marathon at the 1968 Summer Olympics.

References

External links
 

1932 births
Living people
Athletes (track and field) at the 1960 Summer Olympics
Athletes (track and field) at the 1968 Summer Olympics
Ethiopian male long-distance runners
Ethiopian male marathon runners
Olympic athletes of Ethiopia
Athletes from Addis Ababa
20th-century Ethiopian people